James Hargest College is a large school of about 1,950–2,000 students, in Invercargill, New Zealand. The school caters for students from year 7–13.

The school is divided into two campuses, known as James Hargest Junior Campus (Year 7–8) and James Hargest Senior Campus (Year 9–13).  The campuses are at opposite ends of Layard Street and are separated by about a 20-minute walk (1.5 km).

James Hargest College is named after Brigadier-General James Hargest.

Junior campus

James Hargest Junior Campus was formerly known as Rosedale Intermediate School until it became part of the former James Hargest High School to make James Hargest College as part of the Ministry of Education review of schools in 2004.  Other intermediate schools in the city merged with the newly formed James Hargest Junior Campus, increasing the school's roll and stretching resources.  Because of this, a new technology block has been built, and several new classrooms have been built since the merge. There are 21 homeroom classrooms.
The subjects in the New Technology Block (known as the Atrium) include Science, Art, Woodwork (known as Hard Materials), Foods & Fabrics technology, and an ICT & Media Suite.

Senior campus
The Senior Campus covers Years 9–13, and as of 1 July 2020 had 1271 enrolled students. The school has a New Zealand $ 2.2 million library, which officially opened in 2004 that also includes the Guidance and Careers Centre, as well as a Library Reading Room and Library Classroom.  The library's classroom has desks, computers and an interactive whiteboard, as well as the reading room where students can browse the library's collection of magazines, newspapers and many books.  There are also DVD movies available for hire to students.

 A Block – Administration Block. Contains Main Office, Hall, Student Administration, Staffroom, Deans and Associate/Deputy Principals Offices.
 B Block – 4x Language Classrooms, 5x Science Laboratories, 2x Computer Labs and Student Support Centre.
 C Block – Commerce and Food and Fabrics Department. Subjects taught here – Digital Technologies (3x Computer Classrooms), Food Technology (2x Food Labs) and Fashion and Design. The Block was badly damaged by fire on 3 January 2013 by Arson after undergoing a refurbishment which resulted in the block being torn down and completely rebuilt, which was completed April 2014. During this period of rebuilding, Subjects such Digital Technologies were taught in other classrooms around the school, and Food Technology classes were bussed down to the Junior Campus to have lessons.
 D Block – Art & Visual Design (3x Classrooms), Design & Visual Communication, One Science Laboratory, and a Metal & Wood Workshop (Hard Materials) .
 E Block – E1-E5 is Mathematics and Theory Subjects (PE & Health Theory). E6-E7 is Science and Horticulture (2x Science Laboratories) and E8-E15 is English.
 F Block – Social Sciences. F6 – F9 are used for Accounting, Mathematics and Economics.
 G Block – Gyms 1–3 are all located and are used for teaching physical education, as well as sports at lunchtime. Gym 3 is the largest gym of them all, used for large events such as the end of Year Prize Givings. An upstairs gallery is located in the Gym allowing students to sit upstairs and watch sports at lunchtime.
 M Block – Used For Teaching and Practising Music.
 N Block – Extra "prefab" Classrooms used for teaching Mathematics, Science (Theory), Physical Education (Theory) and Childcare and Development.
 P Block – P1 is used for additional classrooms for Physical Education and Health Education. P2 and P3 are used for teaching English. P4 is the Year 13 Common room. P5 P7 are also used for teaching English, and Drama. P8 is used as a storage room.

Hargest Centre
The Hargest Centre is a large building at the senior campus.  The large gymnasium viewing gallery is popular with students who often go there to watch interclass sports at lunch break.  There is a cafeteria at the centre, where students can purchase their lunch, and there are tables for the older students to eat indoors.

C Block Fire
During the early hours of Thursday 3 January 2013, the C Block was badly damaged by a deliberately lit fire. The block was undergoing major renovations at the time. Fortunately, most of the equipment in the block, such as computers and servers, had been removed months prior to the fire. On 15 January 2013, it was revealed that the fire was deliberately lit by two ex-students of the school. They were sentenced to 3 years, 4 months jail and 3 years, 6 months jail respectively.

Sports 
School sports are popular and well established at Hargest.  The school frequently shares inter school sporting competitions with rivals Logan Park High School in Dunedin and Gore High School in Gore.

Students can partake in a very wide variety of sports to represent the school, and there are often notices for tryouts in provincial sports teams.

Everyone at Hargest is placed into a school house.  These are Menzies (green), Watson (blue), Thompson (red) and Hamilton (yellow).  Near the beginning of each school year, the four houses compete for points at an athletics competition at Surrey Park Athletics Park, next to Stadium Southland.

Principals
On 24 August 2009, Paul O'Connor, who had been Principal since 1993, announced his resignation from the role due to retirement. He remained principal until the end of 2009.
On 5 November 2009, Andy Wood was announced as Paul O'Connor's successor in the role. Wood was principal of Central Southland College in nearby Winton. Wood was also deputy principal of the college from 1982 to 2003. He began in the role in the first term of 2010. In November 2019, Mike Newell was announced as the new principal of the school. He started at the beginning of Term 2, 2020.

Notable alumni

Steve Broad – X Factor and New Zealand Idol and More FM Breakfast Announcer
Nathan Cohen – Olympic champion and two-time world champion rower
Eddie Dawkins – Gold medal at 2010 Cycling World Cup, silver at 2011 Cycling World Cup
Jon Gadsby – comedian
Suzanne Prentice – country singer
Bonnie Soper – actress on Shortland Street
Storm Uru – Olympic rower
Andrew Wheeler – basketball player
Peter Beck – CEO of Rocket Lab
Justice Christine French – Court of Appeal Judge,

References 

Schools in Invercargill
Secondary schools in Southland, New Zealand
Educational institutions established in 1958
1958 establishments in New Zealand